Bajan , or Bajan Dialect, is an English-based creole language with African and British influences spoken on the Caribbean island of Barbados. Bajan is primarily a spoken language, meaning that in general, standard English is used in print, in the media, in the judicial system, in government, and in day-to-day business, while Bajan is reserved for less formal situations, in music, or in social commentary. Ethnologue reports that, as of 2018, 30,000 Barbadians were native English speakers, while 260,000 natively spoke Bajan.

Languages
Bajan is the Caribbean creole with grammar that most resembles Standard English. There is academic debate on whether its creole features are due to an earlier pidgin state or to some other reason, such as contact with neighbouring English-based creole languages. 

Due to emigration to the Province of Carolina, Bajan has influenced American English and the Gullah language spoken in the Carolinas. Regionally, Bajan has ties to Belizean and Guyanese Creoles.

Unlike Jamaica, Guyana or Trinidad, Barbados was the destination of few enslaved African-born captives after 1800. Thus, African Barbadians became "Bajanised" relatively soon after British colonization. This tended to make them less resistant to local culture, with its Anglicised language, religion and customs.

Bajan is a primarily spoken language with no standardised written form. Due to the lack of standardisation, spelling may vary widely from person to person. There is much dialectal variation throughout the island. Barbadians practising Rastafari on the island also tend to speak more with a Jamaican accent than full Bajan. Bajan words and sentences presented below are largely spelled as they are pronounced. New terminology, expressions, jargon, and idioms are regularly added to the dialect by social commentary sung during the annual Crop Over festival.

Features
Unlike most other Caribbean creoles, Bajan is fully rhotic, and if anything more rhotic than North American Standard English. Bajan also has a strong tendency to realize syllable-final  as a glottal stop .

Pronouns
Pronouns in Bajan Dialect do not diverge too far from Standard English, but there are differences. As with other similar creoles, Bajan does not differentiate subject and object pronouns, nor possessive pronouns, except in the case of the first person singular. Another difference is the word for the plural you, which is wunna, similar to the Jamaican word unnu / unna or Bahamian yinna. Here is a list of pronouns in Bajan Dialect:

Questions
The structure of questions in Bajan Dialect varies from that of Standard English, as it is generally the same format as regular statements. Questions seeking yes or no answers are usually pronounced as a statement with only a raised intonation to differentiate, usually on the last word. For example, Wunna win de cricket?  means "Did you (pl.) win the cricket match?"; das yours? means "Is that yours?"

On the other hand, questions asking for information, i.e. who, what, when, where, why or how, usually begin with a 'question word/phrase', saying what is being asked for, followed by a partial, or incomplete statement. For example, "Wha he wan?" means "What does he want?" or "He wants what?" Some question words, however, do not exist, or are seldom used in Bajan dialect, including when, where and why, and are achieved by making questions beginning with "wha" (what). For example, "Wha time you see he?" means "When did you see him?", and "Wha part de Chefette?" means "Where is the Chefette?" In addition, "why" questions can be achieved by asking "how come". For example, "How come you get hay so late?”

Tenses
The tense/aspect system of Bajan is fundamentally unlike that of English. In Bajan, verbs are seldom conjugated, and only have a few forms, lacking forms to express tense or distinguish between singular and plural. In particular, there are no morphological marked past tense forms corresponding to English "-ed", "-t" or other past tense forms.

Continuous Tenses
Continuity is shown in Bajan dialect in much the same way as it is in Standard English. In Bajan, the base of the verb is changed by adding "-in", "ing" or "ine" to the end. For many verbs, this simply results in a contracted form of the Standard English. For example, the base "do", from "to do", becomes "doin" in continuous tenses, which is a contracted form of the Standard English "doing".

Showing Tense
In Bajan dialect, the tense of a verb is expressed through 'tense indicators'. These are special verbs which are conjugated for this purpose, and generally derive from the verbs "to be", "to do" and "to go".

The present tense is indicated by the words is or does, with is being considered less proper. For example, 
"I does guh church pun a Sunduh/Sundy" → "I go to church on Sundays"
"He does eat nuff apples" → "He eats a lot of apples"
The phrase "I is" or "I does", is quite commonly shortened to "Ise". e.g. "Ise guh church pun a Sunduh."
The past tense unlike other tenses, is not indicated by a tense indicator, and uses only the base of the verb. For example,
"He walk town" → "He walked to town"
"Dem eat all de food" → "They ate all of the food".
As an exception to the rules, the verb "to go" is conjugated to "went". For example,
"I went to church Sunduh" → "I went to church on Sunday"

In Bajan dialect, when the past tense structure is made continuous, it instead becomes the present continuous, for example "He watchin de show" means "He is watching the show", and "She gine eat" means "She is going to eat". The present and past perfect continuous tenses replaces the past continuous.
The present perfect tense uses the indicator "duh". For example,
"He duh dun get hey" → "He has already arrived"
"Wunna dun guh school" → "You all have gone to school.
The past perfect or pluperfect tense is indicated by the word "did" or "dih". For example,
"He did wan guh tuh de confrunce" → "He had wanted to go to the conference".
The future tense is indicated by the word "gun" or "gon". For example,
"She gine bring wunna de receipt" → "She will bring you all the receipt"

There are many more nuances to Bajan verbs and tenses in addition. One such nuance is that unlike Standard English, Bajan also tends towards using a zero copula. E.g. "We in de garage" means "We are in the garage". Moreover, the indicators are also used as copulas, much like "to be" in Standard English. E.g. "She duh in de house" means "She was in the house".

Negative
Negatives are achieved by modifying the tense indicator of the sentence to end in n, or by adding ain before the verb in the past tense, present continuous or in place of the copula, or in front of the indicator in the present perfect tense. Here is a list of indicators and their negative form.

{| class = "wikitable"
!Tense !! Indicator !! Negative !! Bajan Example !! Standard English
|- align="center"
! Present 
| does/is 
| (does/is) doan 
| Dem is doan talk to weHe doan ask fuh directions.
| They don't talk to usHe doesn't ask for directions.
|- align="center"
! Past
| -
| ain
| I ain do dahWunna ain finish wunna homework nuh?
| I didn't do thatYou all did not finish your homework, did you?
|- align="center"
! Present Perfect
| duh
| ain duh
| She ain duh guh townDem ain duh stop at de shop.
| She hasn't gone to townThey hadn't stopped at the shop.
|- align="center"
! Past Perfect
| did
| din/din did
| Dem din walk tuh she party Wunna din did eat de cake.
| They hadn't walked to her party You all hadn't eaten the cake.
|}

"I ain" is usually contracted to "Ah'n". e.g "Ah'n see she dis evening" means "I didn't see her this evening".

Proverbs
Some of the common Bajan proverbs are listed below.

African words in Bajan

Although most words in Bajan dialect are English in origin, many words are borrowed from West African languages. The largest portion contributed to Bajan is from the Igbo language.

 wunna You all from the Igbo word , which means you (plural).
 obeah From Igbo , 'doctoring, mysticism, or oracle'.
 Bim From Igbo , 'my place, people, kindred', common nickname for Barbados
 de, deh From Igbo , 'present in'
 duppy From Twi .
 Cou-cou Part of the local national dish, but comes from "Fou Fou" in Africa.
 nyam (Pronounced "ng-yam" or "yamm") Means to eat ravenously or greedily, as in "Don't yamm the food like that boy!" – In Manjaku (language spoken in Guinea-Bissau) and in Pulaar it means 'to chew' (pronounced "nyam"); it also means 'chew' in Luo (language spoken in East Africa).
 jook/juk From the Fula word  'poke, spur'
 soso From the Igbo language word  'only'
 hard-head From , (head + hard, strength), 'obstinate'

See also
Queen's English
British English
English in Barbados
Gullah language
English-based creole languages
List of countries and territories where English is an official language
Barbadian culture
Music of Barbados

References

Bibliography

 Blake, Renee A. 1997. "All o' we is one? Race, class and language in a Barbados community". PhD, Stanford University.
 Burrowes, Audrey (in collaboration with Richard Allsopp), 1983. "Barbadian Creole: A note on its social history and structure". In Lawrence Carrington, Dennis Craig, & Ramon Todd Dandaré, eds, Studies in Caribbean Language. St. Augustine, Trinidad: Society for Caribbean Linguistics, 38–45.

 Fields, Linda. 1995. "Early Bajan: Creole or non-Creole?" In Jacques Arends, ed., The Early Stages of Creolization. Amsterdam, Philadelphia: Benjamins, 89–112.

 Holm, John A. 1988. Pidgins and Creoles, vol. II: Reference Survey. Cambridge: Cambridge University Press.

 Rickford, John R. 1992. "The Creole residue in Barbados". In Nick Doane, Joan Hall, & Dick Ringler, eds. Old English and New: Essays in language and linguistics in honor of Frederic G. Cassidy. NY: Garland, 183–201.
 Rickford, John R. & Renee Blake. 1990. "Copula contraction and absence in Barbadian Creole English, Samaná English and Vernacular Black English". In Kira Hall et al., eds. Proceedings of the 16th Annual Meeting of the Berkeley Linguistics Society. Berkeley CA: Berkeley Linguistics Society, 257–68.
 Rickford, John R and Jerome S. Handler. 1994. "Textual evidence on the nature of early Barbadian speech, 1676–1835". Journal of Pidgin and Creole Languages 9: 221–55.
 Roberts, Peter A. 1988. West Indians and their language. Cambridge: Cambridge University Press. (written by a Bajan)
 Winford, Donald. 2000. "'Intermediate' Creoles and degrees of change in Creole formation: The case of Bajan". In I. Neumann-Holzschuh and E. W. Schneider, eds, Degrees of Restructuring in Creole Languages. Amsterdam, Philadelphia: Benjamins, 215–245.
 A~Z of Barbados Heritage, by Sean Carrington, Macmillan Caribbean – Macmillan Publishers Limited Press, 2007, paperback. 
 Notes for: A Glossary of Words and Phrases of Barbadian Dialect, by Frank A. Collymore, Second Edition – Advocate Co. Limited Press, 1957, paperback
 "From Bajan To Standard English", by Jerome Davis, Website of author Jerome Davis, former Barbadian Consul to Canada
"Barbadian Dialect Poetry", by Kathleen Catford, Common sense & evidence: The art of Bajan dialect , Nation Newspaper

Further reading 
 Caribbean Poetry-Barbados
 African Influences on Barbados, Trevor Marshall
 http://www.barbadosdialect.page.tl : Introduces the book "From Bajan To Standard English". Highlights Bajan Dialect. See 50 common Bajan expressions
 Reflections of Barbados (A RADIO PROGRAMME - AUDIO ONLY), The Barbados Government Information Service

External links 
 Bajan language, SIL.org

Barbadian culture
English-based pidgins and creoles
English language in the Caribbean
Creoles of the Caribbean
Languages of Barbados
Languages of the African diaspora